The 2014 Ekiti State gubernatorial election occurred in Nigeria on 21 June 2014, the PDP nominee Ayo Fayose won election, defeating Kayode Fayemi of the APC.

Ayo Fayose emerged PDP gubernatorial candidate after scoring 462 votes and defeating his closest rival, Caleb Olubolade, who received 7 votes, Dayo Adeyeye came third with 3 votes and Modupe Ogundipe had 1 vote. He picked Kolapo Olushola as his running mate. Kayode Fayemi was the APC candidate. 14 candidates contested in the election.

Electoral system
The Governor of Ekiti State is elected using the plurality voting system.

Primary election

PDP primary
The PDP primary election was held on 22 March 2014. Ayo Fayose won the primary election polling 462 votes against 3 other candidates. His closest rival, Caleb Olubolade, had 7 votes, Dayo Adeyeye came third with 3 votes and Modupe Ogundipe received 1 vote.

APC primary
The APC primary election was held on 13 April 2014. Kayode Fayemi won the primary election polling 192,767 votes against other candidates who participated.

Results
A total number of 14 candidates registered with the Independent National Electoral Commission to contest in the election.

References 

Ekiti State gubernatorial election
Ekiti State gubernatorial election
Ekiti State gubernatorial election
Ekiti State gubernatorial elections